The Theatre of War Project is an offering of social impact theater company Theater of War Productions that presents readings of Sophocles' Ajax and Philoctetes for military and civilian communities.

History
The story of Philoctetes, dealing with the wounded man and the interwoven relationships with others, has been frequently noted. In 2005, Bryan Doerries, writer and director, began a series of readings of the play in the New York City area. He had noted the reactions of the audience to the reading, especially the reactions of audience members to the interaction of the suffering soldier and the conflicted caregiver. The project revolves around presenting such readings, especially to audiences of medical professionals and students.

A number of readings were followed by a panel discussion about doctor-patient relationships, involving presenters in psychiatry, physicians, and military medical personnel.

The concept has also been extended to training of medical students, such as a presentation in 2007 to the first year medical class at Weill Medical College of Cornell University, involving not only the students, but also faculty members. The presentation included a discussion of an actual case dealing with the patient-caregiver interactions that parallel the situation Sophocles presented.

In 2008, at a conference dedicated to finding new ways to help US Marines recover from post-traumatic stress and other disorders after serving in Iraq or Afghanistan, four New York actors presented a dramatic reading from Philoctetes and Ajax. The plays focused on physical and psychological wounds inflicted on the warrior.

They have also presented plays such as: Prometheus Bound and The Women of Trachis.

Theatre of War have performed in the UK presented by the military charity Glen art with actors 
Lesley Sharp and Jason Isaacs at Edinburgh Castle and The Southbank Centre in London in 2015.

In March 2018, Glen Art presented Theatre of War’s first performance in Scotland for a serving military audience.

In July 2020 the Scottish charity Bravehound joined with The Theatre of War Project presenting an online performance with Jason Isaacs, Nyasha Hatendi, Lesley Sharp and David Elliot.

Bibliography

References

External links 
 http://theaterofwar.com/
https://www.arts.gov/photos/theater-war
On Being interview by Krista Tippett, April 2021

Theatre companies in the United States
Ancient Greek theatre
Sophocles